Ševarlije is a village in the municipality of Doboj, Bosnia and Herzegovina.This village is home to Bosnian footballer,  Aidin Mahmutović of FK Teplice and formerly of Celik Zenica.

References

Villages in Republika Srpska
Populated places in Doboj

sh:Ševarlije (Doboj)